In Norse mythology Mundilfari (rendered variously Mundilfari, Mundilföri and Mundilfœri) (Old Norse, possibly "the one moving according to particular times") is the father of Sól, goddess associated with the Sun, and Máni, associated with the Moon. Mundilfari is attested in the Poetic Edda poem Vafþrúðnismál stanza 23, and in chapter 11 of the Prose Edda book Gylfaginning.

Etymology
The name appears in various forms in attestations for the figure, some of them significantly different, and various theories have been proposed for the name. John Lindow states that if the first element, mundil- is related to mund, meaning "period of time," then the name may be a kenning for the Moon, as Rudolf Simek theorizes.

See also
Hyperion (Titan)
World Mill

Notes

References
 Lindow, John (2001). Norse Mythology: A Guide to the Gods, Heroes, Rituals, and Beliefs. Oxford University Press. 
 Simek, Rudolf (2007) translated by Angela Hall. Dictionary of Northern Mythology. D.S. Brewer 

Characters in Norse mythology